PrintKey 2000 is an old screenshot software program which rose to popularity in the late 1990s that runs under the Windows operating system. The free software allows the user to modify screenshots after they are taken. The program is activated by the Print screen button or a configurable Control key combination, then displays an image of the screenshot for editing.

PrintKey 2000, though lacking some of the features of paid programs, was well received. And thanks the fact it is compatible with Windows systems up to and including Windows 10, it still sees some use to this day.

References

Screenshot software